Retro Rewind was an American nationally syndicated radio show hosted by Dave Harris. Retro Rewind featured music from the 80s and 90s and also the popular segment, "7 Minutes of 70s". The show usually featured interviews and sometimes performances from the artists from the time period. The show also promoted the current and latest projects from these artists.

In late 1997 Dave Harris conceived the name, the idea, and concept of Retro Rewind. He launched the show nationwide across the United States in February 1998. Harris wrote and executive produced every installment of the syndicated show. In 1998, Harris took a leave of absence to serve as the manager of the band the Outfield. Harris took over hosting duties of Retro Rewind in 1999.

On Saturdays, Retro Rewind aired a live show from 9:00 PM - 12:00 Midnight (US, Eastern Time), which also streams on the show's official website.  Dave Harris also hosted a weekly chat room while on the air, where he took LIVE RET-quests from listeners.

References

External links
Retro Rewind official site 

American music radio programs